Michelyne St-Laurent (born 16 June 1948) is a Canadian politician. She was a member of the National Assembly of Quebec for the riding of Montmorency, first elected in the 2012 election. She was defeated in the 2014 election.

References

External links
 

1948 births
Canadian women lawyers
Coalition Avenir Québec MNAs
French Quebecers
Lawyers in Quebec
Living people
Politicians from Quebec City
Université Laval alumni
Women MNAs in Quebec
21st-century Canadian politicians
21st-century Canadian women politicians